WildStorm started publishing comics in 1992. Since then, they have published an increasing number of titles, both in the Wildstorm fictional universe and in various creator-owned titles.

Under the most recent sub-imprint structure, all Cliffhanger and Homage titles were published under the Wildstorm Signature Series sub-imprint, all WildStorm properties were published under the Wildstorm Universe sub-imprint, and all licensed properties were published through the Wildstorm sub-imprint.

However, in August 2006, WildStorm dropped all sub-imprints in order to simplify the line for retailers and customers, consolidating their output under a single "Wildstorm" label.

Publications with Image Comics

Publications at DC Comics

ABC
America's Best Comics was an imprint of Wildstorm that published Alan Moore's League of Extraordinary Gentlemen and his ABC line of comics.

Cliffhanger

Eye of the Storm
Short-lived mature-aged line.

Homage Comics

Crossovers
 Captain Atom: Armageddon
 Coup d'Etat
 Fire From Heaven
 Devil's Night
 Planetary/Authority: Ruling the World
 Planetary/JLA: Terra Occulta
 Planetary/Batman: Night on Earth
 WildC.A.T.s/Aliens
 WildC.A.T.s/X-Men
 Wildstorm Annual
 Wildstorm Rising
 Wild Times

Non-universe titles
 Bay City Jive
 Casey Blue: Beyond Tomorrow
 Global Frequency
 The Highwaymen
 Legend
 The Programme

Licensed titles
 Aiva's Story
 Assassin's Creed: The Fall
 Bullet Witch
 EverQuest
 Farscape
 Freddy vs. Jason vs. Ash (co-published with Dynamite Entertainment)
 Friday the 13th
 Gears of War
 God of War
 Heroes
 Modern Warfare 2: Ghost
 A Nightmare on Elm Street
 Nier
 Ninja Scroll
 Mirror's Edge
 Push
 Resident Evil
 Resistance
 Robotech
 Snakes on a Plane
 Speed Racer
 Star Trek
 Supernatural
 The Texas Chainsaw Massacre
 ThunderCats
 World of Warcraft

Wildstorm Signature Series
 Albion
 The American Way
 Chuck
 Desolation Jones
 Ex Machina
 Manifest Eternity
 Matador
 Ocean
 Silent Dragon
 Twilight Experiment
 Wildsiderz
 Wraithborn

References

External links
 Wildstorm general search at the Grand Comics Database
 
 

 
Wildstorm
Wildstorm